Syritta indica is a species of syrphid fly in the family Syrphidae.

Distribution
Taiwan, Nepal, India.

References

Eristalinae
Diptera of Asia
Insects described in 1824